Dychawica  is a village in the administrative district of Gmina Wola Mysłowska, within Łuków County, Lublin Voivodeship, in eastern Poland.

References

Dychawica